Marine environmental protection is one of the eleven missions of the United States Coast Guard (USCG).

Protecting the delicate ecosystem of oceans is a vital Coast Guard mission. The Coast Guard works with a variety of groups and organizations to ensure the livelihood of endangered marine species.

Through the Marine Environmental Protection program, the Coast Guard develops and enforces regulations to avert the introduction of invasive species into the maritime environment, stop unauthorized ocean dumping, and prevent oil and chemical spills.

There are five areas of emphasis in the marine environmental protection (MEP) mission. These areas cover virtually every aspect of oil and chemical response, and provide the goals and objectives for Coast Guard initiatives.

The five areas are:
 Prevention
 To stop pollution before it occurs, with:
 Training
 Equipment
 Procedures
 Enforcement
 To provide civil and criminal penalties for illegal acts
 Surveillance
 To protect the marine environment by conducting:
 Pollution overflights
 Vessel boardings
 Harbor patrols
 Transfer monitoring
 Facility inspections
 Response
 Cleanup and impact limitation of an oil or chemical discharge
 In-house abatement
 Ensure that Coast Guard vessels and facilities comply with federal pollution laws and regulations

References

External links 
 

United States Coast Guard
Ocean pollution
Environmental protection agencies
Environmental agencies in the United States